The Ghost Pilot may refer to:

"The Ghost Pilot", an episode of SWAT Kats: The Radical Squadron
Gunnar "the Ghost Pilot" Andersson (1923–1974), Swedish aviator